Rebecca Alexander (born November 4, 1958) is an American politician, businesswoman, and former teacher serving as a member of the Tennessee House of Representatives from the 7th district. She assumed office on January 12, 2021.

Education 
Alexander graduated from Daniel Boone High School in Gray, Tennessee. She then earned a Bachelor of Arts degree in English, sociology, and psychology from Milligan College and a Master of Education from East Tennessee State University.

Career 
Alexander began her career as an English teacher. She then joined Magnavox, eventually becoming a national sales manager with the organization. She also helped her husband operate his family's business, the Dillow-Taylor Funeral Home. Alexander was elected to the Tennessee House of Representatives in November 2020.

Personal life 
She is married and has two daughters.

References 

Living people
1958 births
Republican Party members of the Tennessee House of Representatives
21st-century American politicians
21st-century American women politicians
Milligan University alumni
East Tennessee State University alumni
People from Washington County, Tennessee